Iqbal Zafaruddin Ahmed or Iqbal Z. Ahmed (born 3 February 1946) is a  businessman and philanthropist of Pakistan.

Biography

Born in Patna, India, Ahmed is the son of Zohra (died 1979) and Z. Z. Ahmed (1910–1989), a former deputy inspector general of Pakistan Police. He was schooled at Sadiq Public School, Bahawalpur, and Aitchison College, Lahore. He has a bachelor's degree in economics from Government College, Lahore, and a master's degree in economics from Punjab University, Lahore.

Career

Associated Group (AG) was cofounded by Ahmed and his father in 1965. Today, AG is among Pakistan's largest producers, transporters and marketers of liquefied petroleum gas (LPG) in the private sector. Its companies include Jamshoro Joint Venture Limited, Pakistan GasPort Consortium Limited, Lub Gas, Mehran LPG, AG Publications, and Associated Estate Developers (AEDL). AG has its headquarters at Lahore and offices in Islamabad and Karachi. AG's philanthropic efforts are directed through the Zohra and Z. Z. Ahmed Foundation. AG chairman Ahmed is also the Publisher and chairman of the board of Newsweek Pakistan.

Honors

Self-made businessman Ahmed, who started in business at the age of 16, has been featured in Newsweek International and Forbes, and profiled on CNBC Pakistan.

The state of Oklahoma declared 21 April 2009, as "Iqbal Z. Ahmed Day" to commemorate, according to the proclamation issued by Governor Brad Henry, "Mr. Ahmed's efforts to bring stability to the region and improve relations between Pakistan and the United States includ[ing] his support for President Obama's plan to add economic support to previously provided military support, shifting the priority for America's investment in Pakistan's stability; and ... Mr. Ahmed's efforts to champion peace and stability in Pakistan and the region; improve relations between Pakistan and the United States; provide power to underserved areas of his country; and forge a mutually beneficial partnership between Pakistan and Oklahoma businesses [a]s a positive example for everyone".

JJVL, Pakistan's single largest producer of LPG which represents post-9/11 foreign direct investment, has been recognised by its peers in the global energy world becoming a finalist six times, four years in a row, at the Platts Global Energy Awards held annually in New York.

Newsweek Pakistan and Ahmed hosted an exclusive event for Dr Abdullah Gul, President of the Republic of Turkey, at Lahore on 2 April 2010.

The Lahore Chamber of Commerce and Industry, on 14 September 2012, awarded Ahmed the President of Pakistan trophy for his contribution to Pakistan's economy.

Organizations

Ahmed is the chairperson of Lahore Literary Festival Society, president of Government College University's (GCU) Endowment Trust Fund, member of the Faiz Ahmed Faiz Foundation, chairman of the Services Institute of Medical Sciences (SIMS), president of King Edward Medical University's (KEMU) Mobilization Fund, and a trustee of National College of Arts' (NCA) Endowment Board. He has also served on the board of the Punjab Red Crescent Society, and is a member of the American Business Forum (ABF). Ahmed is also the elected chairman of the LPG Association of Pakistan (LPGAP). He has previously served as the president of the India-Pakistan World Punjabi Organization.

External links
World LNG Summit, Lisbon, Nov 2017 
BW names FSRU for Pakistan GasPort terminal, Jan 2017
 Pakistan GasPort plans listing, Bloomberg, June 2016
 Lahore Literary Festival, The News, February 2014
 Government College Endowment Fund Trust
 World LNG Summit speaker biography, Barcelona, Nov 2012
 LNG Journal's Outlook 2012 speakers, May 2012
 Pakistan GasPort signs Loan Term Sheet with OPIC, Bloomberg, October 2011
 The Buddhist Heritage of Pakistan, Asia Society, Fall 2011
 Government College University, Newsletter, January 2011
 Government College University launches faculty training fund, Dawn, August 2010
 Newsweek Pakistan event caps President Gul's state visit. Business Recorder, April 2010
 Newsweek to launch Pakistan edition, March 2010
 Rental power for Pakistan, Forbes, July 2009
 Barnstormer, Forbes, July 2009
 Leaders, July–September 2009
 Promise in Pakistan, Newsweek, March 2006
 Hanging Fire, Asia Society, 2009–2010
 US Embassy Press Release, April 2009
 'Lahore, Karachi.' Indian Express, January 2003
 LPG king fined millions, November 2010

References

Living people
Pakistani philanthropists
Mass media in Pakistan
Aitchison College alumni
Pakistani businesspeople
Government College University, Lahore alumni
1946 births
Businesspeople from Patna
University of the Punjab alumni
Sadiq Public School alumni